Vijaykumar Vinayak Dongre (V V Dongre) (born in 1940) is a medical doctor from Mumbai who has devoted his entire life  for the eradication of leprosy in the urban and rural areas, including the tribal areas, in the Indian State of Maharashtra. According to some estimates, there were approximately 40 lakh leprosy patients in India in 1981, but after the efforts of Dongre and others this has come down to 83,000. Dongre is affiliated to The Society for Eradication of Leprosy, Mumbai and is serving the Society as its Honorary Secretary. Dongre was associated with Acworth Leprosy hospital, Mumbai as the Medical Superintendent for nearly 35 years and with Gandhi Memorial Foundation, Wardha as a director for nearly 8 years.

Dongre is a Graduate of Faculty of Aurvedic Medicine (GFAM), holds the MBBS degree,  and Post-Graduate Diplomas in Public Relations and Advertising Management and Medico-Legal Systems.

Recognition: Padma Shri

In the year 2022, Govt of India conferred the Padma Shri award, the third highest award in the Padma series of awards, on Vijaykumar Vinayak Dongre    for his distinguished service in the field of medicine. The award is in recognition of his service as a "Veteran Dermatologist and Social Worker dedicated his life to working for Leprosy patients".

Other recognitions/achievements

International Gandhi Award for the year 2013
Life Time Achievement Award by The Indian Association of Leprologists (2021)

Positions held
Dongre has held several important positions in various organisations involved in the efforts for the eradication of leprosy. These include 
President, National Leprosy Organisation (NLO)
Hon. Secretary, Society for the Eradication of Leprosy, Bombay
Sr. Consultant, LEAP, ALERT-INDIA
President, Voluntary Health Association of India New Delhi
President, Indian Association of Leprologists (Maharashtra Branch)
Hon. Secretary, International Leprosy Union, Pune
Hon. Secretary, Acworth Leprosy Hospital-Society for RRE in Leprosy, Mumbai
Hon. Secretary, Hind Kusht Nivaran Sangh, Maha Branch

Publications
Dongre has published several research papers relating to eradication of leprosy. Some of the research publications of Dogre, coauthored with his colleagues, have been cited in Google Scholar portal. To create awareness about leprosy, Dongre has also written and distributed 52 booklets on leprosy.

Publications of Vijaykumar Vinayak Dongre cited in Google Scholar

See also
Padma Shri Award recipients in the year 2022

References

Living people
Recipients of the Padma Shri in medicine
Medical doctors from Mumbai
20th-century Indian medical doctors
Indian leprologists
1940 births